|}

The Cork Stakes is a Listed flat horse race in Ireland open to horses aged three years or older.
It is run at Cork over a distance of 6 furlongs (1,206 metres), and it is scheduled to take place each year in late March or early April.

The race was first run in 2001.

Records

Most successful horse (2 wins):
 Downforce – 2017, 2018

Leading jockey (4 wins):
 Billy Lee – Bold Thady Quill (2013), An Saighdiur (2014), Downforce (2017,2018)

Leading trainer (3 wins):
 Ger Lyons – ''Rain Delayed (2010), The Reaper (2012), Power Under Me (2022)

Winners

See also
 Horse racing in Ireland
 List of Irish flat horse races

References

Racing Post:
 

Flat races in Ireland
Open sprint category horse races
Cork Racecourse
Recurring sporting events established in 2001
2001 establishments in Ireland